The 1953 Georgia Bulldogs football team represented the Georgia Bulldogs of the University of Georgia during the 1953 college football season.

Schedule

Source: GeorgiaDogs.com: 1953 football schedule

Roster
Zeke Bratkowski, Sr. (C)

References

Georgia
Georgia Bulldogs football seasons
Georgia Bulldogs football